Burnet High School is a public high school located in Burnet, Texas, USA, and classified as a 4A school by the UIL.  It is part of the Burnet Consolidated Independent School District located in central Burnet County. In 2015, the school was rated "Met Standard" by the Texas Education Agency.

Athletics
The Burnet Bulldogs compete in these sports - 

Baseball
Basketball
Cross country
American football
Golf
Powerlifting
Soccer
Softball
Swimming and diving
Tennis
Track and field
Volleyball

State finalists
American football - 1991 (3A), 2002 (3A/D1), 2003 (3A/D1)
Cross Country - 2020 (4A), 2021 (4A)
Woman's Basketball - 2019 (4A)

Notable alumni
 Floyd Iglehart, former NFL player
 Stephen McGee, former NFL player
 Dudley Meredith, former NFL player
 Jordan Shipley, former NFL player

References

External links
Burnet CISD

Public high schools in Texas
Schools in Burnet County, Texas